The province of Banten in Indonesia is divided into kabupaten or regencies which in turn are divided administratively into districts, known as kecamatan.

The districts of Banten (with the regency into which each falls) are as follows:

Angsana, Pandeglang
Anyar, Serang
Balaraja, Tangerang
Banjar, Pandeglang
Banjarsari, Lebak
Baros, Serang
Batuceper, Tangerang
Bayah, Lebak
Benda, Tangerang
Binuang, Serang
Bojonegara, Serang
Bojong, Pandeglang
Bojongmanik, Lebak
Cadas Sari, Pandeglang
Carenang, Serang
Carita, Pandeglang
Cibadak, Lebak
Cibaliung, Pandeglang Selatan
Cibeber, Cilegon
Cibeber, Lebak
Cibitung, Pandeglang
Cibodas, Tangerang
Cigeulis, Pandeglang
Cijaku, Lebak
Cikande, Serang
Cikedal, Pandeglang
Cikeusal, Serang
Cikeusik, Pandeglang
Cikulur, Lebak
Cikupa, Tangerang
Ciledug, Tangerang
Cilegon, Cilegon
Cileles, Lebak
Cilograng, Lebak
Cimanggu, Pandeglang
Cimanuk, Pandeglang
Cimarga, Lebak
Cinangka, Serang
Ciomas, Serang
Cipanas, Lebak
Cipeucang, Pandeglang
Cipocok Jaya, Serang
Cipondoh, Tangerang
Ciputat Timur, Tangerang Selatan
Ciputat, Tangerang
Ciputat, Tangerang Selatan
Ciruas, Serang
Cisata, Pandeglang
Cisauk, Tangerang
Cisoka, Tangerang
Citangkil, Cilegon
Ciwandan, Cilegon
Curug, Serang
Curug, Tangerang
Curugbitung, Lebak
Gerogol, Cilegon
Gunungkaler, Tangerang
Gunungkencana, Lebak
Jambe, Tangerang
Jatiuwung, Tangerang
Jawilan, Serang
Jayanti, Tangerang
Jiput, Pandeglang
Jombang, Cilegon
Kaduhejo, Pandeglang
Karangtanjung, Pandeglang
Karangtengah, Tangerang
Karawaci, Tangerang
Kasemen, Serang
Kelapa Dua, Tangerang
Kemiri, Tangerang
Kibin, Serang
Kopo, Serang
Kosambi, Tangerang
Kragilan, Serang
Kramatwatu, Serang
Kresek, Tangerang
Kronjo, Tangerang
Labuan, Pandeglang
Larangan, Tangerang
Legok, Tangerang
Leuwidamar, Lebak
Maja, Lebak
Malingping, Lebak, Banten
Mancak, Serang
Mandalawangi, Pandeglang
Mauk, Tangerang
Mekarbaru, Tangerang
Menes, Pandeglang
Muncang, Lebak
Munjul, Pandeglang
Neglasari, Tangerang
Pabuaran, Serang
Padarincang, Serang
Pagedangan, Tangerang
Pagelaran, Pandeglang
Pakuhaji, Tangerang
Pamarayan, Serang
Pamulang, Tangerang
Pamulang, Tangerang Selatan
Pandeglang, Pandeglang
Panggarangan, Lebak
Panimbang, Pandeglang
Panongan, Tangerang
Pasarkemis, Tangerang
Patia, Pandeglang
Periuk, Tangerang
Petir, Serang
Picung, Pandeglang
Pinang, Tangerang
Pondok Aren, Tangerang
Pondok Aren, Tangerang Selatan
Pontang, Serang
Pulo Merak, Cilegon
Puloampel, Serang
Purwakarta, Cilegon
Rajeg, Tangerang
Rangkasbitung, Lebak
Sajira, Lebak
Saketi, Pandeglang
Sepatan Timur, Tangerang
Sepatan, Tangerang
Serang, Serang
Serpong Utara, Tangerang Selatan
Serpong, Tangerang Selatan
Setu, Tangerang Selatan
Sindang Jaya, Tangerang
Sobang, Lebak
Solear, Tangerang
Sukadiri, Tangerang
Sukamulya, Tangerang
Sukaresmi, Pandeglang
Sumur, Pandeglang
Taktakan, Serang
Tanara, Serang
Tangerang, Tangerang
Teluknaga, Tangerang
Tigaraksa, Tangerang
Tirtayasa, Serang
Tunjung Teja, Serang
Walantaka, Serang
Wanasalam, Lebak
Waringinkurung, Serang
Warunggunung, Lebak 

 
Banten

id:Kategori:Kecamatan di Banten